Homer Davis is a Jamaican Labour Party politician and Minister of State in the Ministry of Local Government and Rural Development.

References 

Living people
21st-century Jamaican politicians
Government ministers of Jamaica
People from Saint James Parish, Jamaica
Members of the House of Representatives of Jamaica
Jamaica Labour Party politicians
Year of birth missing (living people)
Members of the 14th Parliament of Jamaica